Nandamuri Taraka Ratna (22 February 1983 – 18 February 2023) was an Indian actor who worked in Telugu cinema. After his debut in Okato Number Kurraadu (2003), he acted in several films as the lead actor and a few as the antagonist. He was a member of the Nandamuri family which is influential in Telugu cinema and politics. Taraka Ratna was also an aspiring politician from the Indian state of Andhra Pradesh, rooting for the Telugu Desam Party. He died on 18 February 2023 at the age of 39 at Narayana Institute of Cardiac Sciences, following severe health complications.

Early life 
Nandamuri Taraka Ratna was born on 22 February 1983 in Hyderabad, Andhra Pradesh. He is the son of Nandamuri Mohan Krishna, a cinematographer in Telugu cinema and Nandamuri Shanti. He is the grandson of Telugu actor and former Chief Minister of Andhra Pradesh, N. T. Rama Rao, his wife Nandamuri Basavatarakam and N. Trivikrama Rao. He has a sister, Rupa.

Ratna was the cousin of actors Nandamuri Kalyan Ram and Jr. N.T.R, and politician Nara Lokesh. He is the nephew of actor and politician Nandamuri Balakrishna, actor and politician Nandamuri Harikrishna, politicians Daggubati Purandeswari,Daggubati Venkateswara Rao, and former chief minister of Andhra Pradesh, N. Chandrababu Naidu.
Fondly called "Obu" by his family, Taraka Ratna was reportedly willing and preparing himself to contest in the 2024 Andhra Pradesh Legislative Assembly Elections, according to Telugu Desam Party chief N. Chandrababu Naidu.

Career 
Ratna made his debut with Okato Number Kurraadu (2002), written and produced by K. Raghavendra Rao. During his debut, Taraka Ratna signed nine films at once as the lead (a world record) including Yuva Rathna (2003), Taarak (2003), and Bhadradri Ramudu. His role as the antagonist in Amaravathi (2009), for which he received a Nandi Award, was well received.
He also acted in Nandeeswarudu, Maha Bhaktha Siriyala(2014), Venkatadri(2009), Kakatheeyudu(2019), Devineni(2021) and a webseries 9 Hours among others.

Family 
Taraka Ratna married Alekhya Reddy, a divorcee, on August 2, 2012 at the Sanghi Temple . She was a costume designer in one of his films where they met and fell in love. Despite both their families being against the marriage, they tied the knot in the presence of a couple of friends and two family members from Reddy's side. The couple were blessed with three children, a girl in 2013 and later a twin boy and a twin girl.

Illness and death 
On 27 January 2023, he participated in a political road yatra yuva galam  event with his cousin Nara Lokesh in Kuppam, Andhra Pradesh. During the event, Ratna suffered a massive cardiac arrest and fainted. He was administered Cardio Pulmonary Resuscitation (CPR) and first aid. He was taken to a local hospital in Kuppam for treatment, and on the following day transferred to a specialized cardiac hospital in Bangalore. Heart specialists from USA were brought for his treatment, and procedures Balloon Angioplasty, Intra Aortic Balloon Pump, vasoactive support and other advanced cardio services were provided to him two days before his death. 

Ratna died on 18 February 2023, at the age of 39 while undergoing treatment in Bangalore just 4 days before his 40th birthday.

Filmography

Television

Awards
2009 – Nandi Award for Best Villain – Amaravathi

References

External links
 

1983 births
2023 deaths
Telugu male actors
Male actors in Telugu cinema
Indian male film actors
21st-century Indian male actors
Nandi Award winners
Male actors from Andhra Pradesh